Mohsen Garousi (born 28 November 1968) is an Iranian retired football player and manager. Following his playing career, he coached Shahab Zanjan F.C. and served as the assistant of Farhad Kazemi at Paykan F.C. He was later appointed by Ekbatan F.C. as the head coach, but was sacked after only five matches in charge. He also played for Geylang United F.C. in Singapore during 1996 and 1997 seasons.

Achievements
4th Place: 1992 FIFA Futsal World Championship with Iran national futsal team.
Champion: ECO Cup 1993 with Iran national football team.
Champion: 1992–93 Asian Club Championship with PAS Tehran F.C.

References
 Mohsen GAROUSI at TeamMelli.com
 
 
 

1968 births
Living people
Esteghlal F.C. players
Iranian men's futsal players
Iranian footballers
Pas players
Association football forwards
Iran international footballers